Jennifer Brady is a former Democratic member of the Ohio House of Representatives, representing the 16th District from 2007 to 2009. Brady is a former member of the Ohio Legislative Black Caucus.

External links
Elect Jennifer Brady - Official campaign website
Profile on the Ohio Ladies' Gallery website 
Project Vote Smart - Representative Jennifer Brady (OH) profile
Follow the Money - Jennifer Brady
2006 campaign contributions

Democratic Party members of the Ohio House of Representatives
Living people
Women state legislators in Ohio
University of Dayton alumni
African-American state legislators in Ohio
African-American women in politics
People from Westlake, Ohio
21st-century American politicians
21st-century American women politicians
Year of birth missing (living people)
21st-century African-American women
21st-century African-American politicians